Needwood Baptist Church and School are historic buildings (a church and a school) north of Brunswick, Georgia, along US 17.  The oldest parts of the church date to the 1870s.  The towers were added circa 1885 and contain a bell dated 1884. Thirty original pews and other original furnishings remain.  The church is of no particular style, but is similar to many rural African-American churches. The school has one room and is of similar age and construction as the church.  The school was used for African-American students until the 1960s.  The church and school were added to the National Register of Historic Places in 1998.

Gallery

References

External links
 

One-room schoolhouses in Georgia (U.S. state)

Churches on the National Register of Historic Places in Georgia (U.S. state)
Churches completed in 1885
Buildings and structures in Glynn County, Georgia
Churches in Georgia (U.S. state)
School buildings on the National Register of Historic Places in Georgia (U.S. state)
National Register of Historic Places in Glynn County, Georgia